The Province of Canada was the union of Canada West (formerly Upper Canada and later Ontario) and Canada East (formerly Lower Canada and later Quebec).  The new Province had a single bicameral Parliament, replacing the parliaments of Lower Canada and Upper Canada. The new Parliament consisted of the elected lower house, the Legislative Assembly, and the appointed upper house, the Legislative Council.

The Province of Canada lasted from 1841 to 1867, when it was dissolved upon the creation of Canada by the Confederation process. During its existence, there were eight general elections to elect the members of the Legislative Assembly. The first general election was in the spring of 1841, while the eighth and last was in 1863.  While party lines were somewhat blurred, there were political parties.

There are many examples of groups of MPs going against the party line, or splitting a party into two.  A good example of this is when a number of Liberal MPs supported John A. Macdonald, a Conservative, and his idea for Canadian Confederation, many other Liberal Party members were opposed to Confederation.

After the establishment of the double majority principle, any bill, to be passed, needed a majority of MPs from both Canada West and Canada East.  This sometimes led to coalitions between Ontario Liberals and Quebec Tories, or vice versa.  The elections listed below are divided into "Left" or "Reformer" camps, and "Right" or "Conservative" camps.

1841 
The general election began on March 8, 1841, and continued into early April.

Four major parties contested the 1841 election.  The Reformers from Canada West were a group of pro-democracy, radical Reformers who wanted to change the government.  The Family Compact from Canada West was a group of rich Tories interested in the status quo.
Canada East had two similar groups.  Les Patriotes, a reformist group consisting almost exclusively of French Canadians, and the Tories, a mostly English group.

1844
By 1841, the Family Compact had started calling itself Tories as well. This election also saw the creation of the Liberal Party, made up of pro-Patriot members from Canada East, who spoke English.

1848
By 1848, the Reformers were popular once more in Canada West.   

Due to the problems of the last parliament, the Governor General was ordered to sign everything that came from this legislature, marking the birth of responsible government in Canada.  This was the celebrated Ministry of Louis-Hippolyte Lafontaine and Robert Baldwin.

1851
Before the 1851 election, the Patriotes changed their name to Ministeralists. After being popular and in power for so long, they began to somewhat favour the status quo, and began to lose their "radical" roots. The remaining Patriotes, became "Rouges", or "Reds" in English.

1854
1854 was unique, seeing a new group rise. Some reformers were unhappy with the slow pace of reforms, and began to oppose the reformist government. They called themselves "Clear Grits" in Canada West, and gained the support of the Liberals and Rouges in Canada East. Also, around this time, the Tories began to refer to their group as the "Conservative Party".

To stay in government, the moderate reformers formed a coalition with the Conservatives. The better-formed Conservative party, led by Sir John A. Macdonald, took over the Reform Party, and the remaining Reformers left for the Clear Grits, renaming the party, the Liberal Party. The Liberal Party is still known as the 'Grits' in most of English speaking Canada today.

1858
1858 saw the birth of the "Bleu" movement in Quebec. Former Ministeralists became French-Canadian Tories, and took on the name "Bleu" or Blue, to oppose the Rouges. The "new" politics were more Liberal vs. Conservative than Reform vs. the status quo as many former Reformers began to sit with the Conservatives.  This Ministry was headed by George Brown.

1861
The election of 1861 saw the Liberal party finally become united. This election is notable as exactly 29 Liberals were elected from each half of the Province of Canada, and exactly 35 MPs supportive of the Conservative/Centrist movements were elected from each half, which created a regionally balanced government.

1863 
The final election for the Province of Canada took place in 1863. By this time, most liberals and conservatives were in favour of representation by population and confederation. George Brown led a group of Upper Canadian liberals to form a coalition with the Upper Canadian conservatives and the Lower Canadian Bleus, and began a discussion on confederation of all of the British North America colonies.  The confederation project received wide support from Upper Canada, general opposition from the maritimes and Lower Canada was divided.  Confederation was eventually achieved when 3 of the 6 colonies joined together to become the first four provinces of Canada.

This election was followed by the first federal election, the 1867 Canadian federal election, and later on the first provincial elections. 1867 marked the beginning of two founding myths: the founding of the Canadian nation in English Canada and the pact between two founding peoples in French Canada.

When Canada became a Dominion of the British Empire, the Conservatives and Liberals retained their names, while the former Reformers became Liberal-Conservatives, and continued to work very closely with the Conservative Party.

See also 

 List of Joint Premiers of the Province of Canada
 List of Canadian federal general elections
 List of Ontario general elections
 List of Quebec general elections
 Legislative Assembly of the Province of Canada
 List of by-elections in the Province of Canada

References 

Province of Canada
Lists of elections in Canada